This is a list of defunct airlines of Georgia.

See also
 List of airlines of Georgia (country)
 List of airports in Georgia (country)

References

Georgia
Airlines
Airlines, defunct